The 35th Artios Awards, presented by the Casting Society of America, honoring the best originality, creativity and contribution of casting to the overall quality of film, television, theatre and short-form projects, was held on January 30, 2020, in New York City, Los Angeles and London.

The television and theatre nominations were announced on September 24, 2019, but the film nominations were announced on January 2, 2020.

Winners and nominees
Winners are listed first and highlighted in boldface:

Film

Television

Short-Form Projects

Theatre

Lynn Stalmaster Award
Geena Davis

Marion Dougherty New York Apple Award
Audra McDonald

Hoyt Bowers Award
Deborah Aquila

Rosalie Joseph Humanitarian Award
Andrew Femenella

Artios Award for Creative Collaboration
Tim Bevan
Eric Fellner

Excellence in Casting Award
Andy Pryor

Special Recognition
Pippa Markham, Kate Buckley and Gillian Hawser for their work in furthering casting honors with the creation of the BAFTA Casting Awards for television and film.

References

Artios
Artios
2020 awards in the United States
January 2020 events in the United States
2020 in New York City
2020 in Los Angeles
2020 in London
Artios Awards